The 1947 CCUNC Owls football team was an American football team that represented the Charlotte Center of the University of North Carolina or CCUNC (now known as the University of North Carolina at Charlotte) as an independent during the 1947 college football season. In their first season under head coach Marion Woods, the team compiled a 1–3 record.

Schedule

References

CCUNC
Charlotte 49ers football seasons
CCUNC Owls football